In certain theories of syntax, an R-expression (short for referring expression) is a category in the three-way classification of noun phrases in binding theory, the other two being anaphors and pronominals. According to principle C of binding theory, R-expressions must be free. R-expressions include names (e.g. Mary, John) and definite DPs (e.g. the cat).

In Chomsky's government and binding theory, an R-expression is an overt NP analysed as [-a. -p] (not anaphor and not pronominal), and hence subject only to Principle C of the Binding Theory, namely, that it be free (unbound) in all domains. Examples of typical R-expressions are "Lisa", "the dog", "my pet unicorn", "the last chapter of the book", and "Janel's cigarettes". The name is derived from the phrase referring expression, used in semantics for the largest class of NPs, but the GB usage is not synonymous with the semantic sense.

References

Generative syntax
Semantics